Ana Lúcia Nascimento dos Santos (born 22 July 1991), commonly known as Dida, is a Brazilian professional footballer who plays as a goalkeeper for Série A1 club Real Brasília FC. She was a member of the Brazil women's national team.

International career
Dida represented Brazil on the under-19 and under-20 national teams and was also called up at senior level.

Controversy
From 2015 to 2016, Dida made appearances for the Equatorial Guinea national team despite having no connection with the African nation. She played the 2015 CAF Women's Olympic Qualifying Tournament and the 2016 Africa Women Cup of Nations Qualifying. On 5 October 2017, she and other nine Brazilian footballers were declared by FIFA as ineligible to play for Equatorial Guinea.

Career statistics

International

Honours
Grótta
2. deild kvenna: 2018
Benfica
Supertaça de Portugal: 2019

References

External links

1991 births
Living people
Sportspeople from Bahia
Brazilian women's footballers
Women's association football goalkeepers
Associação Desportiva Centro Olímpico players
BÍ/Bolungarvík players
Associação Acadêmica e Desportiva Vitória das Tabocas players
CR Vasco da Gama (women) players
São José Esporte Clube (women) players
Ungmennafélagið Tindastóll women's football players
Santos FC (women) players
Afturelding women's football players
Maccabi Holon F.C. (women) players
S.L. Benfica (women) footballers
Campeonato Brasileiro de Futebol Feminino Série A1 players
Ligat Nashim players
Campeonato Nacional de Futebol Feminino players
Equatorial Guinea women's international footballers
Brazilian expatriate women's footballers
Brazilian expatriate sportspeople in Iceland
Expatriate women's footballers in Iceland
Brazilian expatriate sportspeople in Israel
Expatriate women's footballers in Israel
Brazilian expatriate sportspeople in Portugal
Expatriate women's footballers in Portugal